John Charles Olmsted (1852–1920), was an American landscape architect. The nephew and adopted son of Frederick Law Olmsted, he worked with his father and his younger brother, Frederick Law Olmsted, Jr., in their father's firm. After their father retired, the brothers took over leadership and founded Olmsted Brothers as a landscape design firm. The firm became well known for designing many urban parks, college campuses, and other public places. John Olmsted's body of work from over 40 years as a landscape architect has left its mark on the American urban landscape.

Early life
John Charles Olmsted was born in Geneva, Switzerland, in 1852 to John Olmsted and Mary Cleveland (Perkins) Olmsted. His father John, had contracted tuberculosis, which at the time had no treatment. Fresh air and healthy living, including exercise, were recommended. Some sanatoriums were established in mountain areas.

The John Olmsted family returned to the United States to reside at Tosomock Farm on Staten Island in New York. After his father died, his mother remarried, to John's brother, Frederick Law Olmsted. Frederick adopted John as his son. Later he and Mary had a son of their own, Frederick Law Olmsted, Jr., born in 1870.

Career
John Olmsted began his career at his father's firm, where he was later joined by his younger brother Frederick. After their father retired, the two took over leadership, establishing the firm as Olmsted Brothers. They each contracted separately for some projects.

Olmsted expressed his design philosophy of integrated park systems into planning projects in such cities as Portland, Maine; Portland, Oregon; Seattle and Spokane, Washington; Dayton, Ohio, and Charleston, South Carolina. In these cities, he pioneered his comprehensive planning philosophy of integrating civic buildings, roads, parks, and greenspaces into livable urban areas.

Olmsted also designed individual parks in New Orleans; Watertown, New York; and Chicago, Illinois. His work in park design led to commissions for numerous institutions such as school campuses, civic buildings, and state capitals, as well as designs for large residential areas, including roads and schools. His work in comprehensive planning for the communities surrounding industrial plants and factories is considered especially noteworthy.

In all his work, John Olmsted retained a sensitivity to the natural beauty of the site, including its views, vistas, and greenways.  He wanted to ensure that communities and public areas must be comfortable and inviting.  He favored modest, informal structures in a naturalistic setting to large, imposing structures.

His father used him as an assistant in designing landscapes for the 1893 Chicago World's Fair. The younger Olmsted had primary responsibility for the 1906 Lewis and Clark Centennial Exposition in Portland, Oregon, and the 1909 Alaska-Yukon-Pacific Exposition.

In 1899, John Olmsted was a founding member and first president of the American Society of Landscape Architects.

Selected works

1885 - Tappan Square in Oberlin, Ohio, as part of the redesign of Oberlin College. Designed along with his father Frederick Law Olmsted.
1897 - Yerkes Observatory grounds in Williams Bay, Wisconsin. Designed along with his father Frederick Law Olmsted. Updating began in 1906.
1902 - Overton Park (342 acres) and Riverside Park (340 acres) in Memphis, Tennessee, as well as a parkway system of broad boulevards.
1903 - A comprehensive plan for Seattle's city parks and boulevards. John Olmsted was the firm's principal designer in Seattle and laid out a 20-mile-long system of interconnected parkways that linked parks and playfields, greenways, and natural lakes and waterways.
1903 - Grant Park, Atlanta, Georgia
1903 - Washington Park, Portland, Oregon
1905 - Anderson Park in Montclair, New Jersey
1905 - Druid Hills residential district, Atlanta, Georgia
1906 - Oregon State University, a master plan for the Corvallis campus and design and construction of 23 new buildings
1907 - Uplands, Greater Victoria, Victoria, British Columbia, a 465-acre garden suburb with estate-sized lots, serpentine streets and signature lamp posts.
1908 - Bryn Mawr College, update of general campus landscaping plan designed by his father; design for private garden and a small theater in the round
1909 - Alaska-Yukon-Pacific Exposition World's Fair
1909 - Comprehensive plan for the University of Washington, Seattle
1911 - The grounds of the Washington State Capitol in Olympia, Washington

References

National Association of Olmsted Parks - John Charles Olmsted
Olmsted Parks in Seattle, Ibid.
Seattle's Olmsted Parks
University of Washington Campus plans
Bryn Mawr College Plan

External links
John Olmsted arrives in Seattle to design city parks on April 30, 1903 at HistoryLink.org
John Charles Olmsted and Campus Design in Oregon by Joan Hockaday, published in Oregon Historical Quarterly in 2007

1852 births
1920 deaths
American landscape architects
Druid Hills, Georgia